Crashing Hollywood is a 1931 American pre-Code short comedy film directed by Fatty Arbuckle.

Cast
 Virginia Brooks
 Rita Flynn
 Phyllis Crane
 Edward J. Nugent 
 Wilbur Mack
 Walter Merrill
 Bryant Washburn
 George Chandler
 Betty Grable (credited as Frances Dean)

See also
 List of American films of 1931
 Fatty Arbuckle filmography

External links

1931 films
1931 comedy films
Educational Pictures short films
American black-and-white films
1930s English-language films
Films directed by Roscoe Arbuckle
American comedy short films
Films with screenplays by Jack Townley
1930s American films